Wenner-Gren Center is a tower and building complex in Vasastaden, Stockholm, Sweden. The building was constructed 1959–1961, and opened in 1962.

The Center consists of three buildings named Helicon, Pylon and Tetragon. Pylon is a high tower, Helicon is a lower semicircular part surrounding the tower, and Tetragon is a box-shaped building next to the tower. Helicon contains housing for visiting scientists to institutions in the Stockholm area, and this part is owned by one of the Wenner-Gren Foundations. The rest of the complex consists of commercial rental space, although some of it is traditionally used by scientific organisations, such as research-granting bodies.

The Center is named after the businessman Axel Wenner-Gren, who donated funds to finance its construction, after Nobel Prize winner Hugo Theorell had lobbied for having the housing need of visiting scientists addressed.

References

External links 
Website of the Wenner-Gren Foundations

Buildings and structures in Stockholm
Skyscrapers in Sweden
Buildings and structures completed in 1961
Terminating vistas
Residential skyscrapers
Skyscraper office buildings in Sweden